Abū ʿAbdallāh Muḥammad ibn Masʿūd ibn Ṭayyib ibn Faraj ibn Khalaṣa(or Khāliṣa) al-Ghāfiqī al-Shaquri (d. 540 AH) (d. 1146 AD) better known as Ibn Abi'l-Khisal, was a prominent Andalusi secretary, historian, scholar of ḥadīth and poet. He is referred to as Dhu al-Wizaratayn (lit. 'holder of two ministerial responsibilities'), an honorific given to senior ministers in medieval Islamic world.

Biography 
Ibn Abi al-Khisal was most likely born in 1072 in the village of Las Gorgillitas near Segura, where he spent his early years. His nisba al-Ghafiqi shows his ethnic association to the Arab tribe of Ghafiq which settled in the Andalus after accompanying the army of Musa ibn Nusayr (d. 716) that crossed to al-Andalus. While al-Shaquri indicates his geographical affiliation to the region of Segura (in ). After working in the Taifa courts, he moved to the city of Cordoba, which at the time was under the rule of the Almoravids dynasty. As a Katib (lit. 'Secretary') Ibn Abi al-Khisal worked in the court of the Almoravid governor of Cordoba, Muhammad ibn al-Hajj (c. 1090–1106), alongside Abu Muhammad ibn al-Sid (1052–1127), a renowned contemporary Katib. Later in his life, Ibn Abi al-Khisal was appointed as a secretary along with his brother Abu Marwan in the court of the Almoravid Ali ibn Yusuf ibn Tashfin at Marrakesh, the capital city of the Almoravids. Ibn Abi al-Khisal would become the most celebrated Katib among his contemporaries, and was considered the heir to the Andalusi tradition of ornate insha', while also being a respected scholar of Hadith, earning him the honorific title Dhu'l-wizaratayn, however, no sources specify the exact nature of these two offices. His death occurred in 1146 AD in Cordoba.

Works 
According to the historian al-Zirikli, Abi'l-Khisal works includes:

 Tarasuleh wa Shi'reh
 Dhil al-Ghimamah
 Minhaj al-Minqab
 Manaqib al-'Ishrah wa Ami al-Rasul Allah

See also 

 List of pre-modern Arab scientists and scholars

References 

1072 births
1146 deaths
12th-century people from al-Andalus
12th-century Arabs
Poets from al-Andalus